The Ontario Junior C Lacrosse League (OJCLL) is a box lacrosse league sanctioned by the Ontario Lacrosse Association in Canada. The league features teams split into three regional divisions. OJCLL annually play a 16-game schedule and playoffs for the Meredith Cup league championship.

History 

Junior C lacrosse was first sanctioned in Ontario in 1972. A seven-team league played a 20-game schedule and playoffs. After peaking in 1975 with 18 teams and three divisions, Junior C lacrosse dissolved after the 1979 season.

A new OJCLL began operation in 2008 with five teams (Caledon Bandits, Centre Wellington Warlords, Innisfil Wolfpack, Shelburne Vets, West Durham Patriots). Caledon Bandits won that first 2008 title over Centre Wellington.

In 2009 the league added three more teams in Clarington, Kingston and Peterborough. The Caledon Bandits would defend their title defeating Peterborough 3-1 in the final best of five.

While 2010 saw the same teams in the league however the West Durham team would relocate to Whitby plus we would see a new champion in the Clarington Shamrox which would be their first of three titles in a row as they took out Centre Wellington 3-0 in the final.

The 2011 season saw a huge change in the league as it expanded from eight teams with the addition of Halton Hills, Hamilton, Mimico and Wilmot in the west. Eastern expansion included new teams in Brockville, Cornwall, Gloucester, Kahnawake and Nepean. The Huntsville Hawks would also drop down from Junior "B" to join the league while the Centre Wellington Warlords ownership changed and were rebranded as the Fergus Thistles. Clarington Shamrox would take their second title with a win over Peterborough Lakers.

The 2012 campaign saw the league lose two east clubs after just one season as Nepean and Kahnawake did not return. Clarington would take their third title in a row over Halton Hills in the final.

In 2013 the league would stay the same in the number of teams at 16 however there would be a new champion crowned as the Halton Hills Bulldogs took the title in an overtime thriller in Cornwall defeating the three time champs from Clarington 11-10. It was the last year of the tournament format to crown a champion.

In 2014 the league lost another eastern team as Brockville Ballistic ceased operations while the Oakville Hawks and the Six Nations Warriors came in. The league switched back to an East-West division format which saw the Cornwall Celtics defeat the defending champions from Halton Hills 3-0 to win their first title.

The 2015 season saw the Kingston Kings and Hamilton Bengals cease operations. The Peterborough Lakers would claim their first championship as they swept the Six Nations Warriors 3-0 in the league finals.

There was controversy during the 2015 season involving the Six Nations Warriors, who finished with 16 wins and no losses to close out the regular season. It was soon brought to the attention of the Ontario Lacrosse Association that the Warriors had multiple roster violations. In turn, the Warriors forfeited 13 of their wins and dropped from first place in the West Division to seventh. The Warriors would sweep the first two rounds of the playoffs and would not lose a game on the floor until Game 3 of the West Division Finals against the Fergus Thistles. In the 2015 Meredith Cup Finals, the Six Nations Warriors would fall to the Lakers, who swept the series in three games (10-7, 10-3, 9-4).

2016 would see a shift in power in the West Division. The 2015 West champion Warriors dropped to third in the regular season standings while Wilmot Wild and the Fergus Thistles tied for top spot with identical 14-2 records. Both clubs would coast through the first two rounds of the postseason before meeting up in the West finals for the first time. The Wild would get the better of the Thistles by sweeping the series 3-0 en route to their first ever Meredith Cup Finals appearance.  

Since 2014, the East division has been dominated by the play of the Peterborough Lakers and the Clarington Shamrox. They faced off in the East finals in 2015 and again in 2016. In what will go down as one of the most tightly contested playoff series in league history, the Shamrox would eventually eke out a 4-3 win in Game 5 in front of a packed Garnett B. Rickard Arena in Clarington. Clarington went on to sweep the Wild 4-0 despite some close contests. It was their fourth Meredith Cup in seven years. The Shelburne Vets, one of the original five teams from the league reboot, would play their last game in 2016. 

In 2019, the Whitby Warriors would complete the first ever perfect season, completing a 16-0 regular season while sweeping each team on route to their first Meredith Cup. After a first round bye, the Warriors handled the Clarington Shamrox, winning 16-7, 9-5, and 17-10. In the second straight year, the Warriors would battle with the Peterborough Lakers in the East Finals. The Warriors finally got their chance to take down the Lakers, and swept the series by scores of 21-8, 17-10, and 17-6. Whitby would face the Fergus Thistles in the finals with each game decided by one goal. The Warriors finished the series off in Game 4 to cap off the perfect 26-0 season. During the season Matt Shand would set the season points record with 109 (31 goals, 78 assists) in just 14 games. The former Green Gaels Jr. B standout would add another 68 points in nine playoff games. Mike Andersson would set the rookie season points record with 77 (39 goals and 38 assists) and finish second overall in scoring that year.

Teams

Former teams
Brockville Ballistic (2011–14)
Caledon Bandits (2008–19)
Centre Wellington Warlords (2008–10) - changed name to Fergus Thistles
Eastern Townships Extreme Eagles (2018–19)
Gloucester Griffins (2011–18)
Hamilton Bengals (2011–14) - on hiatus during 2015 then moved to Brantford in 2016
Innisfil Wolfpack (2008–12) - relocated to Newmarket
Kahnawake Hunters (2011–12)
Kingston Kings (2009-14) - on hiatus in 2015 before folding in 2016
Mimico Mountaineers (2011–18)
Nepean Knights (2011–12)
Newmarket Saints (2013–14) - relocated to Barrie
Oakville Hawks (2014–18)
Shelburne Vets (2008–16) - on hiatus in 2017 before folding in 2018
Six Nations Warriors (2013–18)
West Durham Patriots (2008–09) - relocated to Whitby

Champions

References

External links
OJCLL
OLA Junior C statistics (through 2019)

Lacrosse leagues in Canada
Lacrosse in Ontario
Ontario Lacrosse Association